Madame Rentz's Female Minstrels was a blackface minstrel troupe composed completely of women. M. B. Leavitt founded the company in 1870. Unlike mainstream minstrelsy at the time, Leavitt's cast was entirely made up of women, whose primary role was to showcase their scantily clad bodies and tights, not the traditional role of comedy routines or song and dance numbers. The women still performed a basic minstrel show, but they added new pieces that titillated the audience. John E. Henshaw, who began his career as a stage hand with Madame Rentz's Female Minstrels, recalled,

"In San Francisco, we had advertised that we were going to put on the can-can. Mabel Santley did this number and when the music came to the dum-de-dum, she raised her foot just about twelve inches; whereupon the entire audience hollored 'Whooooo!' It set them crazy."

The company was a success, and by 1871, at least eleven rival troupes of female minstrels had sprung up, one of which did away with blackface altogether. This movement eventually gave rise to the "girlie show".

Notes

References

Toll, Robert C. (1974). Blacking Up: The Minstrel Show in Nineteenth-century America. New York: Oxford University Press.

Organizations established in 1870
Blackface minstrel troupes
American comedy troupes